Phloiotrya is a genus of beetles belonging to the family Melandryidae.

The species of this genus are found in Europe and Northern America.

Species:
 Phloiotrya concolor (LeConte, 1866)
 Phloiotrya fusca (LeConte, 1878)

References

Melandryidae